Bzovík is a village and municipality in the Krupina District of the Banská Bystrica Region of Slovakia.

History
In historical records, the village was first mentioned in 1135 (Bozouk) when the noble Lampert Hont-Pázmány founded a Cistercian abbey here. In 1433 Bzovík was destroyed by Hussites and in the mid-15th century by commanders from the Krupina Castle. From 1530 to 1567 it belonged to Žigmund Balaša (Hungarian: Zsigmond Balassa).  1567 – 1658 it belonged to the landowners Fánchy and in 1678 it passed to the Jesuits of Esztergom.

Genealogical resources

The records for genealogical research are available at the state archive "Statny Archiv in Banska Bystrica, Slovakia"

 Roman Catholic church records (births/marriages/deaths): 1686-1895 (parish A)
 Lutheran church records (births/marriages/deaths): 1786-1895 (parish B)

See also
 List of municipalities and towns in Slovakia

References

External links
 
 
https://web.archive.org/web/20061017150446/http://www.regionhont.sk/index.php?session=0&action=readtp&id=1103323241
http://www.hrady.sk/?castle=12
https://web.archive.org/web/20070223065243/http://www.bzovik.sk/
https://web.archive.org/web/20070731211521/http://www.muzeum.sk/default.php?obj=mesto&ix=bz
Surnames of living people in Bzovik

Villages and municipalities in Krupina District
Castles in Slovakia